Darker is the debut studio album of C-Tec, released on 1 September 1997 by Synthetic Symphony. The album showcases the band wanting to experiment by integrating different styles and textures into their compositions after the release of their 1995 EP Cyber-Tec. On 5 October 2018 the album was reissued as a music download with an additional track titled  "My Unbreakable Code" and written by Marc Heal.

Reception 

Greg Prato of AllMusic said "the aptly titled Darker is industrial-influenced, aggressive electronic dance music with all of the necessary ingredients for success -- the vocals are sung with the mandatory pissed-off foreign accent, and the music drills into your brain with ease." Pitchfork Media described the music as having "high-energy, egomaniacal attitudes" and claimed "as any good darkwave album would, it also takes a plunge into the lonelier side of despair and isolation." In May 1998 the album peaked at numbers eight and sixty-one on CMJ New Music Monthly's top dance releases and top radio airplay.

Track listing

Accolades

Personnel 
Adapted from the Darker liner notes.

C-Tec
 Jean-Luc De Meyer – vocals
 Ged Denton – keyboards
 Marc Heal – keyboards, vocals, production

'Additional performers
 Phil Barry – sampler
 Rhys Fulber – sampler, additional production
 Björn Jünemann – sampler
 Daniel Myer – sampler
 Dejan Samardzic – sampler

Production and design
 Jim Marcus – cover art (reissue)
 Doug Martin – engineering, additional production
 Jules Seifert – remastering (reissue)

Release history

References

External links 
 
 Darker at Bandcamp
 Darker at iTunes

1997 debut albums
C-Tec albums
Synthetic Symphony albums
TVT Records albums
Wax Trax! Records albums